Asp (Cleo Nefertiti) is a former supervillain appearing in American comic books published by Marvel Comics. The character has been depicted as a member of the villainous Serpent Society as well as the group BAD Girls, Inc., an all-female group of adventurers.

Egyptian Cleo Nefertiti took up her criminal career using the name Asp as part of the Serpent Society. There she formed a friendship with Black Mamba and Diamondback. During one her first jobs with the Serpent Society, she was contracted to kill MODOK, but ran into Captain America during the job. When Viper took control of the Serpent Society from Sidewinder Asp, Black Mamba and Bushmaster refused to betray their leader. With the aid of Captain America they managed to defeat the Viper.

Together with Black Mamba and Diamondback, Asp broke away from the Serpent Society and formed  BAD Girls, Inc., who, while not being outright heroes, often aided Captain America and others in taking down various supervillains. During the Marvel Civil War the BAD Girls, Inc. sided with Captain America's forces. She later returned to the Serpent Society.

Publication history

She was created by writer Mark Gruenwald and artist Paul Neary, and first appeared in Captain America #310, published October 1985.

Fictional character biography
Intelligent yet soft-spoken, Asp was born in Tanta, Egypt. It was there that she earned her reputation as an exotic dancer, being able to charm snakes with her sensual movements. Her ability to generate blasts of energy which cause paralysis intrigued the leader of the Serpent Society, Sidewinder, and he invited her to join the group.

Given the task to spread the word of a new criminal organization to those who would be interested brought Asp and her comrade, Cottonmouth, straight to the notorious Kingpin. She also participated in the mission to murder MODOK, though she was defeated when Captain America entered the battle. She was not as cold-hearted as some of her teammates, though she didn't hesitate to get down and dirty with the best of them. With the Serpent Society, she stole MODOK's corpse from the morgue, and turned it over to A.I.M. Alongside Anaconda, she confronted the Ringmaster over the Death Adder's murder.

Asp became firm friends with fellow members Diamondback and Black Mamba after Viper attempted to take over leadership of the Serpent Society. Viper captured and poisoned Asp, Black Mamba, and Bushmaster because they refused to betray Sidewinder. They were later rescued by Captain America and Diamondback. Asp participated in the Serpent Society's mission to recover mystic objects for Ghaur and Llyra, and battled the X-Men. She also skirmished alone with Captain America at the club where she worked as an exotic dancer, when he confronted her about Diamondback's whereabouts. With Anaconda and Black Mamba, she shadowed Diamondback on her first date with Steve Rogers, and battled the Gamecock.

When the Serpent Society put Diamondback on trial, the Asp voted in her favor. When King Cobra ordered the death of Diamondback, the Asp contacted Sidewinder to rescue Diamondback. The Asp and Black Mamba fought the other Serpent Society members, but were captured along with Paladin and Diamondback by King Cobra and Bushmaster. With the help of Captain America, the four of them escaped and defeated the Serpent Society.

She also briefly battled Alpha Flight during the Acts of Vengeance while fleeing the first Superhuman Registration Act, where it was revealed that she is a mutant. She soon joined Diamondback and Black Mamba in forming BAD Girls, Inc., adopting a new costume. After being ambushed by Anaconda and captured by the Serpent Society, the B.A.D. Girls were rescued by MODAM. With other female costumed criminals, the B.A.D. Girls were invited aboard Superia's cruise ship and joined her Femizons. When Captain America and Paladin infiltrated the cruise ship the Femizons resided on, Asp and Black Mamba decided to help the heroes escape Superia. Asp, Black Mamba, and Impala went to one of the "Bar With No Name" locations, and battled Battleaxe, Steel Wind, and Golddigger. Asp and her friends broke into a former Serpent Society headquarters, battled Sersi, and took an abandoned Serpent Saucer.

She later joined up with the Serpent Society once again, but then left to be reunited with the B.A.D. Girls as freelance mercenaries. They went up against Cable, Deadpool, Luke Cage, and Iron Fist, and eventually teamed up with The Cat to find the "Dominus Objective." However, the B.A.D. Girls eventually discover that Cable was the one who hired them.

Asp is one of the few mutants who retained their powers after the events of M-Day.

During the Civil War storyline, The Asp and the other B.A.D. Girls were revealed to be members of Captain America's "Secret Avengers", openly opposing the Superhuman Registration Act. She took part in the final battle of the "war", but did not accept the offer of amnesty that came with Captain America's surrender.

Later, Asp and the other BAD Girls were captured by The Mighty Avengers in a New York City mall.

During the Dark Reign storyline, Asp is revealed as a member of the Initiative's new team for the state of Delaware, the Women Warriors.

During the Siege, she joined Norman Osborn in the assault on Asgard alongside the Dark Avengers and the Initiative members that are on his side.

During the Avengers vs. X-Men storyline, Asp was once again seen as part of the Serpent Society, apparently having abandoned her attempts at reformation. The group was quickly defeated by Hope Summers during a botched bank robbery.

As part of the All-New, All-Different Marvel, Asp appears as a member of Viper's Serpent Society under its new name Serpent Solutions. Her venom bolt kept Captain America paralyzed while he was a prisoner of the Serpent Society.

Asp later joined several other super-villains as they attended a boxing match in Las Vegas between America Chavez and her girlfriend Magdalena. The match was orchestrated by Arcade, and ended when America's grandmother appeared and defeated the criminals.

Alongside other members of the Serpent Society, Asp joined Constrictor when he revealed he had stolen Iron Fist's mystical book and had planned to sell it to Iron Fist's enemy, Choshin. Unbeknownst to Asp and the other serpents, it was actually Constrictor's son who had donned the costume after his father had died. During a battle with Iron Fist, Sabretooth, and Choshin's samurais, Asp was knocked out of the battle.

Powers and abilities
Asp has the ability to generate a unique form of radiant bioelectricity that she can channel as lightning-like blasts. This energy does not affect inanimate matter, but upon striking a living being causes a rapid paralysis of the nervous system similar to the effect of the neurotoxic bite of certain venomous snakes. Her body constantly generates and stores this energy, but it can be temporarily expended after firing several "venom-bolts" in rapid succession, requiring her to recharge. Asp can accelerate the speed at which her body regenerates energy by engaging in physical activity that increases her heart rate and metabolism.

Asp's "venom-bolts" have different effects, depending on how far they travel before reaching a target, and on how much power she uses in a single bolt. A full-force blast can instantly kill an adult human. Normally, however, her bolts paralyze her victims for several hours, but cause no lasting damage. She can also release blasts of lower intensity that do not instantly paralyze targets, but instead cause neural delays which result in a loss of muscular control and coordination. Her energy bolts can travel roughly twenty-five feet before dissipating.

When fully charged, the Asp's body releases low levels of energy at all times, making prolonged physical contact with her fatal. She can also apparently release a blast of paralytic energy through physical contact without any visible effect.

The Asp is also an accomplished dancer with superb muscular control.

Other characters named Asp
A thief named the Asp (real name Rich Harper) appeared with the N'Kantu, the Living Mummy in the Supernatural Thrillers series. He first appeared in Supernatural Thrillers #9, October 1974.

Other versions

Ultimate Marvel
Asp appeared in the Ultimate Universe as a member of the all-female Serpent Squad. Along with her team, she battled the Fantastic Four while searching for the Serpent Crown.

Marvel Zombies
A zombified version of Asp appeared in the Marvel Zombies universe as an inhabitant of the Deadlands. She attempts to eat Ultimate Thor, but is killed by Rune Thor.

In other media
Asp appeared in the Marvel Future Avengers anime television series episode "Mission Black Market Auction", voiced by Yūko Kaida in Japanese and Laura Bailey in English. A member of B.A.D. Girls, Inc., this version is hired alongside Black Mamba and Diamondback to guard a cruise ship where an illegal auction for a powerful weapon is to take place. However, they are defeated by Wasp, Black Widow, and Charade.

References

External links
 
 

Characters created by Mark Gruenwald
Characters created by Paul Neary
Comics characters introduced in 1985
Egyptian superheroes
Fictional dancers
Fictional mercenaries in comics
Marvel Comics female superheroes
Marvel Comics female supervillains
Marvel Comics mutants